"Sleepy Seas" was a hit song which was first published 1920 by Private Reginald Stoneham while he managed the Melola Salon music store. It was an instant popular success with dance halls. The following year sales expanded to other music publishers. This vocal waltz was used to accompany silent movies, in the era before talkies.

Australian audiences found the song lifted their spirits in times of crisis and "Sleepy Seas" achieved astonishing sales. By 1928 it was universally known across Australia and enjoyed some global success. The song was frequently revived in musical theatre and variety entertainment, more than ten years after publication. The romantic overtones perhaps reflected gender relations in War-time Australia. It was sometimes performed in Islander style with ukulele and grass skirt.

Fortunately, the song escaped the scandals of producer Jack De Garis. Stoneham founded his own music publishing business and sold copies alongside those of fellow Australian composers.

Australia sighed with relief in 1950, as a copy of the music became the singular clue that solved a murder investigation. 

The song was erroneously attributed to famous Australian pop successor Jack O'Hagan. Indeed some felt the song was an emblem of Australia.

Recordings
1924 Kenneth Walters in ragtime style
1927 Metro-Gnomes Dance Orchestra Zonophone Record – 3642 
1935 Johhny Wade in South Sea Islander style - 78 rpm recording audio online preserved at Australian National Film and Sound archive title number 156344
 1946 the 2FC radio dance orchestra (arranged by Harold Arlen)

Arrangements

 Big Band Swing style
 Brass Band
 Jazz Sextet
Violin trio
 Symphony orchestra
 Piano, Accordion and violin trio
 Piano, cello, violin trio

Performances
1921 Geelong Victoria
1921 Haymarket Cinema, NSW
1922 Albany, Western Australia
1922 Majestic Theatre, Adelaide
1922 Grafton, NSW
1922 Sydney, NSW
1922 Perth Western Australia
 1922 Forbes, NSW
1922 Brisbane, Qld
1922 McKay, Queensland
1923 Camperdown, NSW
1923 Launceston in community singing
1923 Adelaide, South Australia
1923 Cairns, North Qld
1923 Perth Western Australia
1924 Tingha, Northern NSW
1924 Sydney, NSW
1924 York, Western Australia
1926 Rockhampton, Queensland
1926 Ireland
1926 Tasmania
1927 Perth, Western Australia
1929 Hoyts Regent, Melbourne
1930 Cairns, Qld
1932 Broken Hill, NSW
1932 Mount Gambier, South Australia
1934 Lithgow, NSW
1942 Kempsey NSW with accordion trio and ballet
1953 Fairfield, NSW
1993 Canberra, ACT
1946 Armidale New South Wales
1946 Bowen, North Queensland
1945 Lithgow, NSW
1951 Dubbo, NSW

Lyrics

References

External links
 Sheet music at National Library of Australia

Australian folk songs
Australian patriotic songs
1920 compositions